Zirzamin is an Iranian television series that was broadcast during September and October 2006, specifically for the month of Ramadan, when it was one of the most popular series in Iran. It was shown on Channel 3 in Iran, and Jame Jam 1 for Iranians living abroad.

Plot
The plot is about a group of forgers; Assadi, Faraj, and Kalani, who sell a land with a fake document to a businessman for 6 billion tomans. Assadi escapes with the money and buries it in the basement of a shabby house. Faraj and Kalani are arrested for having an alcoholic drink. One year later, Faraj tries to find the money, he locates Assadi, who has had an accident and is now paralysed. Assadi tells Faraj where the money is. So, Faraj dresses himself as a poor person and rents a room there.

This sparks the story, with Faraj looking for the money. However, one of the neighbours dislikes him because he wanted one of his friends to rent the room. This makes him hate Faraj and become suspicious about him. Faraj looks for the money, but can't find it, because there are four basement rooms and Assadi does not remember which one it is….

Crew
Director: Alireza Afkhami
Producer: Behrouz Mofid
Scriptwriter: Ali Reza Bazrafshan

References

External links
 http://tv3.irib.ir/

Iranian television series
2000s Iranian television series
2006 Iranian television series debuts
2006 Iranian television series endings
Islamic Republic of Iran Broadcasting original programming